Radio Libreville is a radio station based in Libreville, Gabon's capital. The station played an important role politically in Gabon throughout the 1960s and 1970s and was the state's communication system to the nation.

See also
 Media of Gabon

References

Radio stations in Gabon
Libreville